In a  script (commonly shortened to right to left or abbreviated RTL, RL-TB or R2L), writing starts from the right of the page and continues to the left, proceeding from top to bottom for new lines. Arabic, Hebrew, Kashmiri, Pashto, Persian, Uighur, Sorani Kurdish, Pakistani Punjabi, Sindhi and Urdu are the most widespread R2L writing systems in modern times.

Books designed for predominantly vertical TBRL text open in the same direction as those for RTL horizontal text: the spine is on the right and pages are numbered from right to left.

These scripts can be contrasted with many common modern  writing systems, where writing starts from the left of the page and continues to the right.

The Arabic script is mostly but not exclusively right-to-left; mathematical expressions, numeric dates and numbers bearing units are embedded from left to right.

Uses 
Hebrew and Arabic-Persian are the most widespread RTL writing systems in modern times. As usage of the Arabic script spread, the repertoire of 28 characters used to write the Arabic language was supplemented to accommodate the sounds of many other languages such as Kashmiri, Pashto, etc. While the Hebrew alphabet is used to write the Hebrew language, it is also used to write other Jewish languages such as Yiddish and Judaeo-Spanish.

Syriac and Mandaean (Mandaic) scripts are derived from Aramaic and are written RTL. Samaritan is similar, but developed from Proto-Hebrew rather than Aramaic. Many other ancient and historic scripts derived from Aramaic inherited its right-to-left direction.

Several languages have both Arabic RTL and non-Arabic LTR writing systems. For example, Sindhi is commonly written in Arabic and Devanagari scripts, and a number of others have been used. Kurdish may be written in Arabic, Latin, Cyrillic or Armenian script.

Thaana appeared around 1600 CE. Most modern scripts are LTR, but N'Ko (1949), Mende Kikakui (19th century), Adlam (1980s) and Hanifi Rohingya (1980s) were created in modern times and are RTL.

Ancient examples of text using alphabets such as Phoenician, Greek, or Old Italic may exist variously in left-to-right, right-to-left, or boustrophedon order; therefore, it is not always possible to classify some ancient writing systems as purely RTL or LTR.

Computing support
Right-to-left, top-to-bottom text is supported in common computer software. Often, this support must be explicitly enabled. Right-to-left text can be mixed with left-to-right text in bi-directional text.

List of RTL scripts
Examples of right-to-left scripts (with ISO 15924 codes in brackets) are:

Current scripts
 Persian language  – used for Persian, Urdu, Kashmiri.
 Arabic script ( 160,  161) – used for Arabic and many other languages.
Hebrew alphabet ( 125) – used for Hebrew, Yiddish and some other Jewish languages.
Thaana ( 170) – used for Dhivehi.
 Syriac alphabet ( 135, variants 136–138 ,) – used for varieties of the Syriac language.
Mandaic alphabet ( 140) – closely related to Syriac, used for the Mandaic language.
 Samaritan alphabet ( 123) – closely related to Hebrew, used for the Samaritans' writings. 
 Mende Kikakui ( 438) – for Mende in Sierra Leone. Devised by Mohammed Turay and Kisimi Kamara in the late 19th century. Still used, but only by about 500 people.
 N'Ko script ( 165) – devised in 1949 for the Manding languages of West Africa.
Garay alphabet – designed in 1961 for the Wolof language.
 Adlam ( 166) – devised in the 1980s for writing the Fula languages of West and Central Africa.
 Hanifi Rohingya ( 167) – developed in the 1980s for the Rohingya language.
 Yezidi ( 192) – used for two 12th- or 13th-century Yazidi Kurdish texts; attempts have been made to revive it since 2013.

Ancient scripts
 Indus script
 Egyptian hieroglyphs
 Cypriot syllabary ( 403) – predates Phoenician influence.
 Phoenician alphabet ( 115) – ancient, precursor to Hebrew, Imperial Aramaic, and Greek.
 Imperial Aramaic alphabet ( 124) – ancient, closely related to Hebrew and Phoenician. Spread widely by the Neo-Assyrian and Achaemenid empires. The later Palmyrene form ( 126) was also used to write Aramaic.
 Old South Arabian 
 Old North Arabian 
 Avestan alphabet ( 134) – from Pahlavi, with added letters. Used for recording the Zoroastrian sacred texts during the Sassanid era. 
Hatran alphabet ( 127), used to write the Aramaic of Hatra 
 Sogdian ( 141 and  142) and Manichaean ( 139, associated with the Manichaean religion) – derived from Syriac. Sogdian eventually rotated from RTL to top-to-bottom, giving rise to the Old Uyghur, Mongolian, and Manchu vertical scripts. 
 Nabatean alphabet – intermediate between Syriac and Arabic. 
 Old Ge'ez alphabet ( 495)
 Kharosthi ( 305) – an ancient script of India, derived from Aramaic.
 Old Turkic runes (also called Orkhon runes  175)
 Old Hungarian runes ( 176).
 Old Italic alphabets ( 210) – Early Etruscan was RTL but LTR examples later became more common. Umbrian, Oscan, and Faliscan were written right-to-left. Unicode treats Old Italic as left-to-right, to match modern usage. Some texts are boustrophedon

Old Latin could be written from right to left (as were Etruscan and early Greek) or boustrophedon.
 Lydian alphabet ( 116) – ancient; some texts are left-to-right or boustrophedon.

See also
 Bidirectional text
 Complex text layout (CTL)
 Script (Unicode)
 Writing system

References

External links

 Everson, Michael (2001-01-08) Roadmapping early Semitic scripts https://www.unicode.org/L2/L2001/01024-n2311.pdf
 Buntz, Carl-Martin (2000-21-12) L2/01-007, Iranianist Meeting Report: Encoding Iranian Scripts in Unicode https://www.unicode.org/L2/L2001/01007-iran.txt

Character encoding
Writing direction